The 2019 Football Championship of Kyiv Oblast was won by Avanhard Bziv.

League table

References

Football
Kyiv Ob
Kyiv Ob